Verónica Escobar Romo (born 15 December 1955) is a Mexican lawyer and politician from the Institutional Revolutionary Party. In 2012 she served as Mayor of Acapulco succeeding Manuel Añorve Baños.

See also
 List of mayors of Acapulco (municipality)

References

1955 births
Living people
Politicians from Mexico City
Institutional Revolutionary Party politicians
Women mayors of places in Mexico
Municipal presidents in Guerrero
21st-century Mexican politicians
21st-century Mexican women politicians